The Independent Expert Panel (IEP) is a body of the British Houses of Parliament which determines the appropriate sanction for Members of Parliament in cases involving bullying, harassment or sexual misconduct referred to it by the Parliamentary Commissioner for Standards after investigation by the Independent Complaints and Grievance Scheme. The Panel was established in 2020 in response to a report by Dame Laura Cox and replaced the Committee on Standards in this role.

It is entirely independent from Parliament, and its members are not MPs.

The IEP also hears and adjudicates appeals made to it by respondents.

References

2020 establishments in the United Kingdom
Government agencies established in 2020
Government bodies based in London